State Routes in Ohio are owned by the state, and maintained by the state except in cities. They are signed with a white silhouette of Ohio against a black background.

Markers

List

References

See also
List of Interstate Highways in Ohio
List of U.S. Highways in Ohio

 
State Routes